In mathematics, the Ostrowski–Hadamard gap theorem is a result about the analytic continuation of complex power series whose non-zero terms are of orders that have a suitable "gap" between them. Such a power series is "badly behaved" in the sense that it cannot be extended to be an analytic function anywhere on the boundary of its disc of convergence. The result is named after the mathematicians Alexander Ostrowski and Jacques Hadamard.

Statement of the theorem

Let 0 < p1 < p2 < ... be a sequence of integers such that, for some λ > 1 and all j ∈ N,

Let (αj)j∈N be a sequence of complex numbers such that the power series

has radius of convergence 1. Then no point z with |z| = 1 is a regular point for f, i.e. f cannot be analytically extended from the open unit disc D to any larger open set including even a single point of the boundary of D.

See also
 Lacunary function
 Fabry gap theorem

References

External links
 

Mathematical series
Theorems in complex analysis